Fanny Hill is a 1748 novel by John Cleland. Several adaptations have been made of the novel, including:

 Fanny Hill (1964 film), directed by Russ Meyer
 Fanny Hill (1968 film), directed by Mac Ahlberg
 Fanny Hill (1983 film), directed by Gerry O'Hara
 Fanny Hill (TV serial), 2007 TV serial directed by James Hawes and starring Rebecca Night

Fanny Hill may also refer to:
 Fanny Hill (album), the third album by US rock group Fanny